Orlovsky is a rural locality (a posyolok) in Orlovsky District of Rostov Oblast, Russia. Population:   It is also the administrative center of Orlovsky District.

History 
Orlovsky was founded as a posyolok near Tikhoretskaya—Tsaritsyn line railway station of the Vladikavkaz Railway, which was built in 1896–1898. In 1910 Orlovsky obtained the status of stanitsa. In the same year it began to be quickly settled by cossack families from the villages of the upper Don: from Kurmoiarskaya, Kundriyuchenskaya, Bystryanska, Luganskaya, Semikarakorskaya, Romanovskaya and others. 

According to 1915 data, the settlement had 472 households with 2,097 man and 2,092 women. There were several mills, creameries, smithies, a tannery, hay barns, forest exchanges, three churches, twelve primary schools, and a gymnasium.

In March 1920, during Russian Civil War, the village was taken by Red Army. According to data of the first All-Union Census of the Soviet Union, which was held in 1926, Orlovskaya had the population of 4404 people, of them Russians were 3264 and Ukrainians — 1086.

Places of interest 
 Tulips peninsula, a place of mass blooming of tulips.
 Church of the Nativity of the Blessed Virgin Mary, a Russian Orthodox church built in 2006.

Notable residents 

Nikita Kolotiyevsky (born 2001), football player
Sergei Pavlovich (born 1992), mixed martial artist

References

Rural localities in Rostov Oblast